Anuj Lugun is an Indian poet and writer. His poetry espoused indigenous renaissance and intense rebellion against fascism and oppression. Anuj's activism for social justice earned him the title of Tribal Poet.

Early life and career
Born into a Jharkhandi Mundari family to Ereneus Lugun & Jaymmila Lugun in Jaldega Pahantoli, district Simdega, Jharkhand, Anuj is the nephew of William Lugun, a prominent leader of the Jharkhand movement.

Work and service
Lugun is working as assistant professor in School of Languages and Literature at Central University of South Bihar (CUSB).

Awards and recognition
 Sahitya Academy Yuva Puraskar 2019 for his long Hindi poem Bagh aur Sugna Munda ki Beti (The Tiger and the Daughter of Sugna Munda)
 Anuj Lugun- won the prestigious Bharat Bhushan Agarwal Award in 2011 for the best poem in Hindi

References

Munda people
Poets from Jharkhand
People from Simdega district
Indian male poets
1986 births
Living people
Adivasi writers
20th-century Indian poets
Banaras Hindu University alumni
Hindi-language writers